The Health Protection (Coronavirus, Restrictions) (Local Authority Enforcement Powers and Amendment) (England) Regulations 2020 (SI 1375) is an English statutory instrument empowering local authority officers to issue legally-binding notices to anyone found to be contravening one of the emergency coronavirus provisions. Notices may require remedial action and the closure of premises. Failure to comply is an offence, and may be dealt with by the courts or by issuance of a fixed penalty notice.

The regulations came into effect in England on 2 December 2020 and were revoked at 23:55 on 18 July 2021 by the Health Protection (Coronavirus, Restrictions) (Steps etc.) (England) (Revocation and Amendment) Regulations 2021 (S.I. 2021/848).

Legal basis
The regulations were made on 30 November 2020 by the Secretary of State for Health and Social Care, Matt Hancock, using emergency powers under the Public Health (Control of Disease) Act 1984, the stated legal basis being "the serious and imminent threat to public health which is posed by the incidence and spread of severe acute respiratory syndrome coronavirus 2 (SARS-CoV-2) in England". Hancock used section 45R of the Public Health (Control of Disease) Act 1984 to enact the regulations without prior parliamentary consideration, subject to retrospective approval by resolution of each House of Parliament within twenty-eight days. The regulations entered into force on 2 December 2020 and expire at the end of 20 June 2021.

Coronavirus improvement notices 
A local authority designated officer may issue a coronavirus improvement notice to anyone who is contravening one of the emergency coronavirus provisions (but not in respect of any essential infrastructure). Any such notice must be "necessary and appropriate" and must include a specified list of information, including details of the alleged contravention, what has to be done to remedy it, and the remedial period allowed (at least 48 hours).

The notice must be reviewed by the local authority as soon as practicable after the end of the period specified, or earlier if the recipient states that the requirements have been satisfied. The local authority must then either withdraw the notice or notify the person of their right of appeal.

Coronavirus immediate restriction notices 
A local authority designated officer may issue a coronavirus immediate restriction notice to anyone who is contravening one of the emergency coronavirus provisions and where contravention is likely to continue or to be repeated (but not in respect of any essential infrastructure). Any such notice must be "necessary and appropriate" and must include a specified list of information, including details of the alleged contravention and a statement that failure to comply with the notice is a criminal offence.

The notice must require either or both of the following, and may take effect immediately or after a specified period:

 that the relevant premises be closed
 that the person must end the contravention and ensure that it is not repeated.

The notice remains in effect for 48 hours and must be reviewed by the local authority before the end of that period, or earlier if the recipient states that the requirements have been satisfied. The local authority must then withdraw the notice, amend or re-issue it, or notify the person of their right of appeal.

Coronavirus restriction notices 
A local authority designated officer may issue a coronavirus restriction notice to anyone who has previously received a coronavirus improvement notice and has failed to comply with it (but not in respect of any essential infrastructure). Any such notice must be "necessary and appropriate" and must include a specified list of information, including details of the alleged non-compliance and a statement that failure to comply with the notice is a criminal offence.

The notice must require either or both of the following, and may take effect immediately or after a specified period:

 that the relevant premises be closed
 that the person must end the contravention.

The notice remains in effect for seven days and must be reviewed by the local authority before the end of that period, or earlier if the recipient states that the requirements are no longer necessary. The local authority must then withdraw the notice, amend or re-issue it, or notify the person of their right of appeal.

Enforcement 
It is a criminal offence to fail to comply with any of the above notices without reasonable excuse. Local authority officers are also empowered to issue fixed penalty notices.

Appeals 
Appeals against the issuance or a notice, or a decision on review, may be made to the magistrates court.

Amendments of other regulations 
The regulations also amend a wide variety of other coronavirus statutory instruments.

Expiry 

The regulations were originally set to expire at the end of 2 June 2021, later changed to 20 June 2021.

References

Bibliography

 
 

Statutory Instruments of the United Kingdom
2020 in England
COVID-19 pandemic in England
Public health in the United Kingdom
2020 in British law
Law associated with the COVID-19 pandemic in the United Kingdom